Xavier-Marie Baronnet S.J. (April 5, 1927 in Chantenay, France - September 8, 2012 in Paris, France) was a Jesuit who served as Bishop of the Roman Catholic Diocese of Port Victoria (or Seychelles) from his appointment in 1995 until his retirement in 2002.

Baronnet was ordained a Catholic priest on September 7, 1960. He was appointed the Bishop of Port Victoria o Seychelles on March 3, 1995, by Pope John Paul II. Baronnet was ordained on June 25, 1995. He served as Bishop until his retirement on June 1, 2002. He was succeeded by Bishop Denis Wiehe.

See also
Roman Catholicism in Seychelles

References

1927 births
2012 deaths
20th-century Roman Catholic bishops in the Seychelles
21st-century Roman Catholic bishops in the Seychelles
French Jesuits
Jesuit bishops
20th-century French Jesuits
Seychellois Jesuits
Roman Catholic bishops of Port Victoria